The Atlanta Braves are a National League ballclub (1966–present) previously located in Milwaukee 1953–1965 (Milwaukee Braves) and in Boston 1871–1952. The Boston teams are sometimes called Boston Red Stockings 1871–1876, Boston Red Caps 1876–1882, Boston Beaneaters 1883–1906, Boston Doves 1907–1910, Boston Rustlers 1911, Boston Braves 1912–1935, Boston Bees 1936–1940, Boston Braves 1941–1952. Here is a list of all their players in regular season games beginning 1871.

Bold identifies members of the National Baseball Hall of Fame.

Italics identify players with uniform numbers retired by the team (Atlanta).



A

David Aardsma
Hank Aaron
Tommie Aaron
Ed Abbaticchio
Kurt Abbott
Ted Abernathy
Jim Acker
Manny Acosta
Ronald Acuña Jr.
Lane Adams
Matt Adams
Joe Adcock
Bob Addis
Bob Addy
Morrie Aderholt
Jack Aker
Bill Akers
Ozzie Albies
Jay Aldrich
Cory Aldridge
Doyle Alexander
Antonio Alfonseca
Kolby Allard
Bob Allen
Frank Allen
Myron Allen
Armando Almanza
Sandy Alomar Sr.
Felipe Alou
Garret Anderson
Dario Alvarez
Jose Alvarez
Bill Anderson
Ian Anderson
Josh Anderson
Nate Andrews
Rick Ankiel
Johnny Antonelli
José Ascanio
Jairo Asencio
Andy Ashby
Ken Aspromonte
Bob Aspromonte
Brian Asselstine
Paul Assenmacher
Tom Asmussen
Toby Atwell
Harry Aubrey
Al Autry
Chick Autry
Earl Averill
Steve Avery
Bobby Ávila
Luis Avilán
Luis Ayala
Willy Aybar
Joe Ayrault

B

Johnny Babich
Danys Báez
Bill Bagwell
Ed Bailey
Fred Bailey
Gene Bailey
Harvey Bailey
Dusty Baker
Jeff Baker
Paul Bako
Mike Balas
Lee Bales
Jim Ball
Dave Bancroft
Jimmy Bannon
Walter Barbare
Steve Barber
Frank Barberich
George Barclay
Len Barker
Jesse Barnes
Ross Barnes
Virgil Barnes
George Barnicle
Dick Barrett
Frank Barrett
Johnny Barrett
Marty Barrett
Red Barrett
Red Barron
Frank Barrows
Kevin Barry
Shad Barry
Brian Barton
Doc Bass
Joe Batchelder
Johnny Bates
Miguel Batista
Howard Battle
Danny Bautista
José Bautista
Bob Beall
Tommy Beals
Brandon Beachy
Mike Beard
Pedro Beato
Jim Beauchamp
Ginger Beaumont
Johnny Beazley
Fred Beck
Beals Becker
Gordon Beckham
Howie Bedell
Steve Bedrosian
Rick Behenna
Stan Belinda
Gus Bell
Les Bell
Mike Bell
Terry Bell
Rafael Belliard
Rob Belloir
Bruce Benedict
Ray Benge
Charlie Bennett
Jeff Bennett
Larry Benton
Juan Berenguer
Marty Bergen
Wally Berger
John Bergh
Sean Bergman
Adam Bernero
Ray Berres
Gerónimo Berroa
Damon Berryhill
Wilson Betemit
Christian Bethancourt
Huck Betts
Vern Bickford
Jesse Biddle
Mike Bielecki
Ethan Blackaby
Earl Blackburn
Lena Blackburne
Aaron Blair
Johnny Blanchard
Al Blanche
Gregor Blanco
Henry Blanco
Kevin Blankenship
Larvell Blanks
Wade Blasingame
Jeff Blauser
Jerry Blevins
Terry Blocker
Tony Boeckel
Joe Boever
Ray Boggs
Tommy Boggs
Frank Bolling
Tommy Bond
Jung Bong
Emilio Bonifacio
Bobby Bonilla
Barry Bonnell
Frank Bonner
Al Bool
Bret Boone
Ray Boone
Pedro Borbón Jr.
Joe Borden
Joe Borowski
J. C. Boscán
Jake Boultes
Peter Bourjos
Michael Bourn
Jim Bouton
Frank Bowerman
Micah Bowie
Blaine Boyer
Clete Boyer
Buzz Boyle
Brad Brach
Larry Bradford
Foghorn Bradley
Jed Bradley
Bill Brady
Bob Brady
King Brady
Darren Bragg
Dave Brain
Ed Brandt
Kitty Bransfield
John Braun
Garland Braxton
Buster Bray
Sid Bream
Jim Breazeale
Jake Brigham
Reid Brignac
Tony Brizzolara
Chris Brock
Steve Brodie
Rico Brogna
Frank Brooks
Sig Broskie
Rex Brothers
Dan Brouthers
Jim Brower
Bob Brown
Buster Brown
Drummond Brown
Eddie Brown
Fred Brown
Jarvis Brown
Lew Brown
Oscar Brown
Sam Brown
Tom Brown
Bill Brubaker
Bob Bruce
George Brunet
Bob Brush
Bill Bruton
Tod Brynan
Ryan Buchter
Francisley Bueno
Art Bues
Charlie Buffinton
Bob Buhl
Danny Burawa
Lew Burdette
Jack Burdock
Joe Burg
Billy Burke
Dan Burke
Frank Burke
John Burkett
Joe Burns
Paul Burris
Jeff Burroughs
Dick Burrus
Guy Bush
Adam Butler
Art Butler
Brett Butler
Cecil Butler
Paul Byrd

C

 Francisco Cabrera
 José Cabrera
 Melky Cabrera
 Trevor Cahill
 Sam Calderone
 Bill Calhoun
 Joe Callahan
 Alberto Callaspo
 Johan Camargo
 Hank Camelli
 Jack Cameron
 Ken Caminiti
 Rick Camp
 Dave Campbell
 Vin Campbell
 Jorge Campillo
 Hugh Canavan
 Bárbaro Cañizares
 Rip Cannell
 Ben Cantwell
 José Capellán
 Buzz Capra
 Pat Capri
 Ramón Caraballo
 Ben Cardoni
 Don Cardwell
 Shane Carle
 Buddy Carlyle
 Eddie Carnett
 Pat Carney
 David Carpenter (b. 1985)
 David Carpenter (b. 1987)
 Clay Carroll
 Cliff Carroll
 Dixie Carroll
 Rico Carty
 Chuck Cary
 Paul Casanova
 Vinny Castilla
 Tony Castillo
 Mike Cather
 Ted Cather
 Red Causey
 Wayne Causey
Orlando Cepeda
 Rick Cerone
 Hunter Cervenka
 Francisco Cervelli
 Jhoulys Chacín
 Chet Chadbourne
 Rome Chambers
 Chris Chambliss
 Darrel Chaney
 Tiny Chaplin
 Larry Chappell
 Bill Chappelle
 Norm Charlton
 Jesse Chavez
 Buster Chatham
 Dave Cheadle
 Bruce Chen
 Larry Cheney
 Matt Childers
 Bob Chipman
 Neil Chrisley
 Lloyd Christenbury
 Ryan Church
 Gino Cimoli
 Pedro Ciriaco
 Jim Clancy
 Earl Clark
 Glen Clark
 Terry Clark
 Boileryard Clarke
 Josh Clarke
 Bill Clarkson
 Buzz Clarkson
 Dad Clarkson
John Clarkson
 Marty Clary
 Chet Clemens
 Jack Clements
 Brent Clevlen
 Ty Cline
 Tony Cloninger
 Brad Clontz
 Al Closter
 Otis Clymer
 Gene Cocreham
 Jack Coffey
 Kevin Coffman
 Ed Cogswell
 Greg Colbrunn
 Dave Cole
 Dick Cole
 Bill Collins
 Don Collins
Jimmy Collins
 Pat Collins
 Wilson Collins
 Zip Collins
 Josh Collmenter
 Bill Collver
 Bartolo Colón
 Román Colón
 Steve Colyer
 Pete Compton
 Clint Conatser
 Gene Conley
 Jocko Conlon
 Frank Connaughton
 Joe Connolly
 Joe Connor
 John Connor
 Brooks Conrad
 Jim Constable
 José Constanza
 William Contreras
 Dick Conway
 Rip Conway
 Duff Cooley
 Bill Cooney
 Jimmy Cooney
 Johnny Cooney
 Gary Cooper
 Mort Cooper
 Walker Cooper
 Lance Cormier
 John Cornely
 Vic Correll
 David Cortés
 Joe Coscarart
 Chuck Cottier
 Ensign Cottrell
 Ernie Courtney
 Dee Cousineau
 Sam Covington
 Wes Covington
 Billy Cowan
 Joe Cowley
 Bill Coyle
 Charlie Cozart
 Del Crandall
 Doc Crandall
 Connie Creeden
 Fred Crolius
 Ray Crone
 Bill Cronin
 George Crowe
 Bill Crowley
 Terry Crowley
 Walton Cruise
 Cal Crum
 Dick Crutcher
 Juan Cruz
 Tony Cuccinello
 Charlie Culberson
 Dick Culler
 Jack Cummings
 Will Cunnane
 Brandon Cunniff
 Bill Cunningham
 Bruce Cunningham
 Todd Cunningham
 George Cuppy
 Sammy Curran
 Cliff Curtis
 Jack Curtis
 Jack Cusick

D

John Dagenhard
Bill Dahlen
Babe Dahlgren
Con Daily
Bruce Dal Canton
Bill Daley
Joe Daly
Bill Dam
Jack Daniels
Alvin Dark
Mike Davey
Ted Davidson
Tucker Davidson
Kyle Davies
Daisy Davis
George Davis
Jody Davis
Mark Davis
Trench Davis
Joey Dawley
Ken Dayley
Grant Dayton
Mike de la Hoz
Chase d'Arnaud
Travis d'Arnaud
Charlie Deal
Pat Dealy
Pat Deasley
Jeff Dedmon
Jim Delahanty
Art Delaney
Randall Delgado
Al Demaree
Frank Demaree
John DeMerit
Gene DeMontreville
Drew Denson
Mark DeRosa
Matt DeSalvo
Rube Dessau
Elmer Dessens
Ducky Detweiler
Mike Devereaux
Adrian Devine
Joey Devine
Art Devlin
Rex DeVogt
Josh Devore
Blake DeWitt
Charlie Dexter
Carlos Diaz
Matt Diaz
R. A. Dickey
Walt Dickson
Bob Didier
Ernie Diehl
George Diehl
Dick Dietz
Steve Dignan
Don Dillard
Vince DiMaggio
Bill Dinneen
Jack Dittmer
Pat Dobson
Cozy Dolan
Art Doll
Josh Donaldson
Mike Donlin
Blix Donnelly
Ed Donnelly
Bill Donovan
Dick Donovan
Patsy Donovan
Gus Dorner
Octavio Dotel
Paul Doyle
Moe Drabowsky
Bill Dreesen
Bob Dresser
J. D. Drew
Tim Drew
Frank Drews
Lucas Duda
John Dudra
Hugh Duffy
Joe Dugan
Oscar Dugey
Bill Dunlap
Mike Dunn
Chad Durbin
Adam Duvall
Jermaine Dye

E

Tom Earley
Mal Eason
Jamie Easterly
Gary Eave
Eddie Eayrs
Derrin Ebert
Ox Eckhardt
John Edelman
Mike Eden
Brian Edmondson
Foster Edwards
Dick Egan
Juan Eichelberger
Mark Eichhorn
Dave Eilers
Bob Elliott
Glenn Elliott
Jumbo Elliott
Rowdy Elliott
Alan Embree
Bob Emmerich
Gil English
John Ennis
Robbie Erlin
Dick Errickson
Nick Esasky
Yunel Escobar
George Estock
Johnny Estrada
Buck Etchison
Chick Evans
Darrell Evans
Johnny Evers

F

Jorge Fábregas
Pete Falcone
Ed Fallenstein
Kyle Farnsworth
Doc Farrell
Kerby Farrell
Gus Felix
George Ferguson
Nanny Fernandez
Wes Ferrell
Lou Fette
Robert Fick
Dana Fillingim
Hank Fischer
Mike Fischlin
Tom Fisher
Charlie Fitzberger
Ed Fitzpatrick
Patsy Flaherty
Ryan Flaherty
Elbie Fletcher
Tyler Flowers
Curry Foley
Mike Foltynewicz
Bill Ford
Gene Ford
Hod Ford
Wenty Ford
Terry Forster
John Foster
Leo Foster
Jack Fournier
Chad Fox
John Fox
Terry Fox
Juan Francisco
Julio Franco
Matt Franco
Jeff Francoeur
Tito Francona
Fred Frankhouse
Wayne Franklin
Chick Fraser
Vic Frazier
Buck Freeman
Freddie Freeman
Jimmy Freeman
Marvin Freeman
Sam Freeman
Howard Freigau
David Freitas
Pepe Frías
Max Fried
Charlie Frisbee
Danny Frisella
Sam Frock
John Fuller
Frank Funk
Rafael Furcal

G

 Frank Gabler
 Len Gabrielson
 Andrés Galarraga
 Dave Gallagher
 Gil Gallagher
 Ron Gant
 Charlie Ganzel
 Gene Garber
 Adonis García
 Dámaso García
 Freddy García
 Jaime García
 Jesse Garcia
 Debs Garms
 Ralph Garr
 Adrian Garrett
 Gil Garrido
 Jim Garry
 Cito Gaston
 Hank Gastright
 Aubrey Gatewood
 Evan Gattis
 Kevin Gausman
 Doc Gautreau
 Dinty Gearin
 Cory Gearrin
 Phil Geier
 Gary Geiger
 Joe Genewich
 Sam Gentile
 Gary Gentry
 Lefty George
 Ben Geraghty
 Lefty Gervais
 Gus Getz
 Charlie Getzien
 Frank Gibson
 Bob Giggie
 Larry Gilbert
 Rod Gilbreath
 Marcus Giles
 Bernard Gilkey
 Carden Gillenwater
 Billy Ging
 Ed Giovanola
 Roland Gladu
 Troy Glaus
 Tom Glavine
 Ed Glenn
 Al Glossop
 Chuck Goggin
 Luiz Gohara
 Hal Goldsmith
 Luis Gómez
 Jesse Gonder
 Álex González
 Mike González (C)
 Mike González (P)
 Tony González
 Gene Good
 Ralph Good
 Wilbur Good
 Ed Goodson
 Sid Gordon
 Reid Gorecki
 Charlie Gorin
 Rubén Gotay
 Hank Gowdy
 Tony Graffanino
 Peaches Graham
 Skinny Graham
 Mark Grant
 Sid Graves
 Nick Green
 Shane Greene
 Tommy Greene
 Kent Greenfield
 Tommy Gregg
 Seth Greisinger
 Ed Gremminger
 Buddy Gremp
 Ken Griffey Sr.
 Hank Griffin
 Tommy Griffith
Burleigh Grimes
 Marquis Grissom
 George Grosart
 Kevin Gryboski
 Ozzie Guillén
 Skip Guinn
 Tom Gunning
 Dick Gyselman

H

 Eddie Haas
 Mert Hackett
 Walter Hackett
 Mickey Haefner
 Hal Haid
 Dad Hale
 Albert Hall
 Bob Hall
 Jimmie Hall
Billy Hamilton (19th-century)
 Billy Hamilton (21st-century)
 Chris Hammond
 Mike Hampton
 Harry Hanebrink
 Preston Hanna
 Jack Hannifin
 Tommy Hanson
 Lou Hardie
 Jim Hardin
 Steve Hargan
 Pinky Hargrave
 Dick Harley
 George Harper
 Terry Harper
 Joe Harrington
 Dave Harris
 Willie Harris
 Roric Harrison
 Dean Hartgraves
 Mickey Haslin
 Buddy Hassett
 Tom Hausman
 Bill Hawes
 Marvin Hawley
 Bob Hazle
 Bunny Hearn (1910s P)
 Bunny Hearn (1920s P)
 Jeff Heath
 Mike Heath
 Adeiny Hechavarria
 Danny Heep
 Wes Helms
 Heinie Heltzel
 Ken Henderson
 Bob Hendley
 Don Hendrickson
 Dwayne Henry
 John Henry
 Snake Henry
 Ron Herbel
Billy Herman
 Al Hermann
 Remy Hermoso
 Diory Hernández
 José Hernández
 Liván Hernández
 Ramón Hernández
 Roberto Hernández
 John Herrnstein
 Earl Hersh
 Frank Hershey
 Buck Herzog
 Joe Hesketh
 Otto Hess
 Mike Hessman
 Joe Heving
 Jason Heyward
 Jim Hickey
 Mike Hickey
 Charlie Hickman
 Brandon Hicks
 Bill Higgins
 Andy High
 Garry Hill
 Milt Hill
 Oliver Hill
 Mike Hines
 Paul Hines
 Eric Hinske
 John Hinton
 Herb Hippauf
 Jim Hitchcock
 Trey Hodges
 Ralph Hodgin
 George Hodson
 Billy Hoeft
 Joe Hoerner
 Stew Hofferth
 Izzy Hoffman
 Shanty Hogan
 Brad Hogg
 Bobby Hogue
 Ray Holbert
 Walter Holke
 Dutch Holland
 Todd Hollandsworth
 Bonnie Hollingsworth
 Damon Hollins
 Darren Holmes
 Tommy Holmes
 Abie Hood
 Dick Hoover
 Johnny Hopp
 Bob Horner
Rogers Hornsby
 Joe Hornung
 Pete Hotaling
 Sadie Houck
 Tom House
 Ben Houser
 Tyler Houston
 Del Howard
 Larry Howard
 Jay Howell
 Al Hrabosky
 Walt Hriniak
 Glenn Hubbard
 Mike Hubbard
 Trenidad Hubbard
 Otto Huber
 John Hudek
 Tim Hudson
 Tom Hughes
 Harry Hulihan
 Bill Hunnefield
 Brian Hunter
 Jerry Hurley
 Jason Hursh
 Warren Huston
 Johnny Hutchings
 Ira Hutchinson

I

Ender Inciarte
Alexis Infante
Omar Infante
Scotty Ingerton

J

Fred Jacklitsch
Alex Jackson
George Jackson
Luke Jackson
Sonny Jackson
Brook Jacoby
Bernie James
Bill James
Chuck James
Dion James
Paul Janish
Pat Jarvis
Larry Jaster
Al Javery
Joey Jay
George Jeffcoat
Virgil Jester
Sam Jethroe
Germán Jiménez
Art Johnson
Bob Johnson (IF)
Bob Johnson (P)
Chris Johnson
Davey Johnson
Deron Johnson
Ernie Johnson
Jim Johnson
Joe Johnson
Kelly Johnson
Ken Johnson
Lou Johnson
Micah Johnson
Randy Johnson
Reed Johnson
Roy Johnson
Si Johnson
Dick Johnston
Jimmy Johnston
Dave Jolly
Andruw Jones
Bill Jones
Brandon Jones
Charley Jones
Chipper Jones
Johnny Jones
Ken Jones
Mack Jones
Nippy Jones
Percy Jones
Sheldon Jones
Eddie Joost
Brian Jordan
Buck Jordan
Mike Jorgensen
Matt Joyce
Wally Joyner
Jorge Julio
Jair Jurrjens
David Justice

K

Bob Kahle
Al Kaiser
Owen Kahn
Scott Kamieniecki
Ike Kamp
Tom Kane
Andy Karl
Steve Karsay
Kenshin Kawakami
Ray Keating
Bill Keister
John Kelleher
Dick Kelley
Joe Kelley
Tom Kelley
Jim Kelly
Joe Kelly
King Kelly
Mike Kelly
Roberto Kelly
Matt Kemp
Art Kenney
Marty Keough
Charlie Kerfeld
Buddy Kerr
Rick Kester
Dallas Keuchel
Hod Kibbie
John Kiley
Frank Killen
Craig Kimbrel
Hal King
Ray King
Jay Kirke
Malachi Kittridge
Billy Klaus
Ryan Klesko
Lou Klimchock
Ron Kline
Steve Kline
Johnny Kling
Fred Klobedanz
Stan Klopp
Billy Klusman
Clyde Kluttz
Elmer Knetzer
Jack Knight
Fritz Knothe
Joe Knotts
Danny Kolb
Gary Kolb
Brad Komminsk
Ed Konetchy
Jim Konstanty
George Kopacz
Larry Kopf
Joe Koppe
Dave Koslo
Casey Kotchman
Mark Kotsay
Fabian Kowalik
Brian Kowitz
Clarence Kraft
Lew Krausse Jr.
Jimmy Kremers
Rube Kroh
Ian Krol
Mike Krsnich
Art Kruger
Steve Kuczek
Charlie Kuhns

L

Frank LaCorte
Lee Lacy
Hi Ladd
Gerald Laird
Fred Lake
Al Lakeman
Frank LaManna
Henry Lampe
Hunter Lane
Walt Lanfranconi
Ryan Langerhans
Johnny Lanning
Gene Lansing
Norm Larker
Adam LaRoche
Swede Larsen
Tony La Russa
Frank Lary
Charley Lau
Bill Lauterborn
Alfred Lawson
Bob Lawson
Freddy Leach
Jack Leary
Wilfredo Ledezma
Bill Lee
Derrek Lee
Hal Lee
Wade Lefler
Lou Legett
Charlie Leibrandt
Denny Lemaster
Mark Lemke
Max León
Andy Leonard
Anthony Lerew
John LeRoy
Dixie Leverett
Bill Lewis
Fred Lewis
Ted Lewis
Don Liddle
Fred Liese
Kerry Ligtenberg
Brent Lillibridge
Derek Lilliquist
Rufino Linares
Vive Lindaman
Ernie Lindemann
Walt Linden
Carl Lindquist
Scott Linebrink
Dick Littlefield
Danny Litwhiler
Mickey Livingston
Bob Loane
Keith Lockhart
Kenny Lofton
Bob Logan
Boone Logan
Johnny Logan
George Lombard
Ernie Lombardi
Herman Long (baseball)
Al López
Albie Lopez
Javy López
Bris Lord
Tom Lovett
Fletcher Low
Bobby Lowe
Derek Lowe
Red Lucas
Rick Luecken
Julio Lugo
Mike Lum
Fernando Lunar
Dolf Luque
Billy Lush
Al Lyons
Steve Lyons

M

Danny MacFayden
Mike Macha
Joe Mack
Ken MacKenzie
Max Macon
Harry MacPherson
Kid Madden
Tommy Madden
Jerry Maddox
Greg Maddux
Sherry Magee
Harl Maggert
Freddie Maguire
Ron Mahay
Mickey Mahler
Rick Mahler
Paul Maholm
Mike Mahoney
Willard Mains
Hank Majeski
John Malarkey
Bobby Malkmus
Les Mallon
Marty Malloy
Charlie Maloney
Leo Mangum
Kelly Mann
Les Mann
Jack Manning
Jim Manning
Don Manno
Félix Mantilla
Dick Manville
Paul Marak
Rabbit Maranville
Nick Markakis
Rube Marquard
Luis Márquez
Jason Marquis
Eli Marrero
William Marriott
Doc Marshall
Mike Marshall
Willard Marshall
Andy Marte
Doc Martel
Billy Martin (2B)
Billy Martin (SS)
Chris Martin
Jack Martin
Ray Martin
Tom Martin
Cristhian Martínez
Dave Martinez
Dennis Martínez
Marty Martínez
Pablo Martínez
Phil Masi
Mike Massey
Red Massey
Joe Mather
Joe Mathes
Bobby Mathews
Eddie Mathews
Pascual Matos
Al Mattern
Gary Matthews
Joe Matthews
Rick Matula
Tyler Matzek
Gene Mauch
Larry Maxie
Darrell May
Dave May
Cameron Maybin
Lee Maye
Eddie Mayo
Bill McAfee
Gene McAuliffe
Dick McBride
Macay McBride
Brian McCann
Bill McCarthy (C)
Bill McCarthy (P)
Brandon McCarthy
Johnny McCarthy
Tom McCarthy
Tommy McCarthy
Jeff McCleskey
Jim McCloskey
Hal McClure
Sam McConnell
Frank McCormick
Mike McCormick
Adam McCreery
Tom McCreery
Ed McDonald
Tex McDonald
Oddibe McDowell
Frank McElyea
Dan McGann
Chippy McGarr
Dan McGee
Tim McGinley
Kevin McGlinchy
Beauty McGowan
Fred McGriff
Stuffy McInnis
Bill McKechnie
Denny McLain
Bo McLaughlin
Joey McLaughlin
Ralph McLeod
Nate McLouth
Don McMahon
Marty McManus
Greg McMichael
Roy McMillan
Craig McMurtry
Dinny McNamara
Tim McNamara
Ed McNichol
Mike McQueen
Hugh McQuillan
Bill McTigue
Larry McWilliams
Kris Medlen
Joe Medwick
Jouett Meekin
Mark Melancon
Denis Menke
Kent Mercker
Bill Merritt
Andy Messersmith
Catfish Metkovich
Dan Meyer
Chief Meyers
Félix Millán
Corky Miller
Doc Miller
Eddie Miller (IF)
Eddie Miller (OF)
Frank Miller
Norm Miller
Stu Miller
Tom Miller
Art Mills
Kevin Millwood
Mike Minor
A.J. Minter
Fred Mitchell
Keith Mitchell
John Mizerock
George Mogridge
Gabe Molina
Raúl Mondesí
Willie Montañez
John Montefusco
Al Montgomery
Donnie Moore
Eddie Moore
Gene Moore
Junior Moore
Randy Moore
Trey Moore
Herbie Moran
Hiker Moran
Pat Moran
Mike Mordecai
Forrest More
Seth Morehead
Omar Moreno
Roger Moret
Cy Morgan
Joe Morgan
Ed Moriarty
Gene Moriarty
Jim Moroney
John Morrill
Akeel Morris
Guy Morrison
Jim Morrison
Bubba Morton
Carl Morton
Charlie Morton
Damian Moss
Ray Moss
Darryl Motley
Jason Motte
Joe Mowry
Peter Moylan
Heinie Mueller
Ray Mueller
Joe Muich
Terry Mulholland
Dick Mulligan
Red Murff
Tim Murnane
Buzz Murphy
Dale Murphy
Dave Murphy
Frank Murphy
John Ryan Murphy
Amby Murray
Jim Murray
Matt Murray
Ivan Murrell
Danny Murtaugh
Greg Myers
Hap Myers

N

Bill Nahorodny
Billy Nash
Jim Nash
Julio Navarro
Denny Neagle
Tom Needham
Art Nehf
Gary Neibauer
Tommy Neill
Bernie Neis
Joe Nelson
Tommy Nelson
Graig Nettles
Johnny Neun
Sean Newcomb
Chet Nichols Jr.
Kid Nichols
Rod Nichols
Tricky Nichols
Dave Nicholson
Fred Nicholson
David Nied
Joe Niekro
Phil Niekro
Butch Nieman
Melvin Nieves
Johnny Niggeling
C. J. Nitkowski
Al Nixon
Otis Nixon
Joe Nolan
Lou North
Jake Northrop
Greg Norton
Don Nottebart
Win Noyes
Vladimir Núñez
Dizzy Nutter
Charlie Nyce

O

Charlie O'Brien
Johnny O'Brien
Danny O'Connell
Darren O'Day
Ken O'Dea
Billy O'Dell
Eric O'Flaherty
Kid O'Hara
Dan O'Leary
Randy O'Neal
Mickey O'Neil
Jack O'Neill
Frank O'Rourke
Jim O'Rourke
John O'Rourke
Tom O'Rourke
Johnny Oates
Ken Oberkfell
Blue Moon Odom
Dave Odom
Joe Oeschger
Rowland Office
Joe Ogrodowski
Will Ohman
José Oliva
Gene Oliver
Hector Olivera
Chi-Chi Olivo
Luis Rodríguez Olmo
Greg Olson
Gregg Olson
Matt Olson
Ed Olwine
Jess Orndorff
Pete Orr
Rafael Ortega
Russ Ortiz
Wayne Osborne
Dan Osinski
Jimmy Outlaw
Lyle Overbay
Larry Owen
Marcell Ozuna

P

Cristian Pache
Tom Paciorek
Don Padgett
Ernie Padgett
Andy Pafko
Mike Page
Phil Paine
David Palmer
Emilio Palmero
Jim Panther
Milt Pappas
Chad Paronto
James Parr
Jeff Parrett
Jiggs Parson
Charlie Parsons
Wes Parsons
Tyler Pastornicky
Gene Patton
Mike Payne
Bill Pecota
Red Peery
Alejandro Peña
Brayan Peña
Ramón Peña
Tony Peña Jr.
Jim Pendleton
Terry Pendleton
Joe Pepitone
Henry Peploski
Hub Perdue
Eddie Pérez
Carlos Pérez
Marty Perez
Odalis Pérez
Pascual Pérez
Gaylord Perry
Gerald Perry
Jason Perry
Dustin Peterson
Dan Petry
Big Jeff Pfeffer
Brandon Phillips
Damon Phillips
Eddie Phillips
Evan Phillips
Taylor Phillips
Wiley Piatt
Ron Piché
Charlie Pick
Dave Pickett
Clarence Pickrel
Al Piechota
Jack Pierce
Al Pierotti
Andy Pilney
Jim Pisoni
Togie Pittinger
Juan Pizarro
Biff Pocoroba
Hugh Poland
Luis Polonia
Tom Poorman
Bob Porter
Bill Posedel
Nels Potter
Jay Powell
Ray Powell
Phil Powers
Martín Prado
Andy Pratt
Todd Pratt
Mel Preibisch
Jim Prendergast
Jim Presley
Bob Priddy
Curtis Pride
Scott Proctor
Hub Pruett
Charlie Puleo
Blondie Purcell
Ewald Pyle

Q

Bill Quarles
Billy Queen
Jack Quinn
Joe Quinn (C)
Joe Quinn (2B)

R

John Rabb
Charley Radbourn
Paul Radford
Pat Ragan
Ed Rakow
Horacio Ramírez
José Ramírez
Rafael Ramírez
Wilkin Ramírez
Bill Ramsey
Newt Randall
Merritt Ranew
Bill Rariden
Josh Ravin
Johnny Rawlings
Irv Ray
Ken Ray
Fred Raymer
Claude Raymond
Jeff Reardon
Anthony Recker
Mark Redman
Billy Reed
Michael Reed
Ron Reed
Steve Reed
Wally Rehg
Earl Reid
Bobby Reis
Tommy Reis
Pete Reiser
Chris Reitsma
Mike Remlinger
Édgar Rentería
Chris Resop
Ed Reulbach
Jo-Jo Reyes
Shane Reynolds
Armando Reynoso
Flint Rhem
Billy Rhiel
Del Rice
Woody Rich
Rusty Richards
Antoan Richardson
Hardy Richardson
Lance Richbourg
Lew Richie
John Richmond
Lee Richmond
Joe Rickert
Marv Rickert
Harry Riconda
Johnny Riddle
Jeff Ridgway
Joe Riggert
Austin Riley
Jim Riley
Royce Ring
Claude Ritchey
Jay Ritchie
Ben Rivera
Luis Rivera
René Rivera
Mel Roach
Skippy Roberge
Charlie Robertson
Gene Robertson
Bill Robinson
Craig Robinson
Humberto Robinson
John Rocker
Pat Rockett
Sean Rodriguez
Chaz Roe
Gary Roenicke
Red Rollings
Ed Romero
Phil Roof
George Rooks
Víctor Rosario
Bob Roselli
Bunny Roser
Steve Roser
Chet Ross
David Ross
Rico Rossy
Bama Rowell
Ed Rowen
Normie Roy
Jerry Royster
Dick Rudolph
Chico Ruiz
Rio Ruiz
Paul Runge
Bob Rush
Chris Rusin
Jim Russell
John Russell
Babe Ruth
Dick Ruthven
Connie Ryan
Cyclone Ryan
Jack Ryan
Rosy Ryan

S

Ray Sadecki
Bob Sadowski
Ed Sadowski
Johnny Sain
Takashi Saito
Bill Salkeld
Jarrod Saltalamacchia
Manny Salvo
Clint Sammons
Billy Sample
Amado Samuel
Aníbal Sánchez
Rey Sánchez
Tony Sanchez
Deion Sanders
Ray Sanders
Reggie Sanders
Mike Sandlock
Pablo Sandoval
Danny Santana
Al Santorini
Ed Sauer
Carl Sawatski
Johnny Scalzi
Les Scarsella
Sid Schacht
Hal Schacker
Harry Schafer
Jordan Schafer
Scott Schebler
Al Schellhase
Butch Schmidt
Jason Schmidt
Dan Schneider
Red Schoendienst
Hank Schreiber
Ron Schueler
Dave Schuler
Wes Schulmerich
Jack Schulte
Johnny Schulte
Joe Schultz
Bill Schuster
Carl Schutz
Don Schwall
Art Schwind
Jack Scott
Rudy Seánez
Chris Seelbach
Socks Seibold
Rube Sellers
Frank Sexton
Cy Seymour
Joe Shannon
Red Shannon
Bud Sharpe
Mike Sharperson
Al Shaw
Bob Shaw
Marty Shay
Dave Shean
Ray Shearer
Earl Sheely
Ben Sheets
Gary Sheffield
Steve Shemo
Bill Sherdel
George Sherrill
Steve Shields
Jason Shiell
Art Shires
Milt Shoffner
Clyde Shoun
Vince Shupe
Oscar Siemer
Al Simmons
Andrelton Simmons
Ted Simmons
Randall Simon
Lucas Sims
Matt Sinatro
Hosea Siner
Elmer Singleton
Steve Sisco
Doug Sisk
George Sisler
Sibby Sisti
Craig Skok
Jimmy Slagle
Enos Slaughter
Lou Sleater
Joe Slusarski
Aaron Small
Hank Small
Roy Smalley
Bob Smith
Dwight Smith
Earl Smith
Edgar Smith
Elmer Smith
Fred Smith
Harry Smith
Jack Smith(OF)
Jack Smith (P)
Jimmy Smith
Ken Smith
Lonnie Smith
Pete Smith
Pop Smith
Red Smith
Stub Smith
Tom Smith
Travis Smith
Will Smith
Zane Smith
John Smoltz
Fred Snodgrass
Pop Snyder
Scott Sobkowiak
Chad Sobotka
Miguel Socolovich
Eddie Solomon
Andy Sommers
Rafael Soriano
Mike Soroka
Elías Sosa
Jorge Sosa
Bill Southworth
Billy Southworth
Bill Sowders
Warren Spahn
Albert Spalding
Al Spangler
Cliff Speck
Tim Spehr
Justin Speier
Chet Spencer
Ed Sperber
Charlie Spikes
Al Spohrer
Tim Spooneybarger
Harry Spratt
Russ Springer
Ebba St. Claire
Randy St. Claire
Marv Staehle
General Stafford
Chick Stahl
Harry Staley
Eddie Stanky
Joe Stanley
Mike Stanton
Charlie Starr
Ray Starr
Harry Steinfeldt
Fred Stem
Bill Stemmyer
Casey Stengel
Dave Stevens
Chris Stewart
Joe Stewart
Jack Stivetts
Phil Stockman
Otis Stocksdale
George Stone
Allyn Stout
Harry Stovey
Paul Strand
Gabby Street
Oscar Streit
Nick Strincevich
Joe Stripp
Allie Strobel
Dutch Stryker
Everett Stull
George Stultz
Bobby Sturgeon
Andy Sullivan
Billy Sullivan
Denny Sullivan
Jim Sullivan
Joe Sullivan
John Sullivan
Marty Sullivan
Mike Sullivan
B. J. Surhoff
Max Surkont
Butch Sutcliffe
Bruce Sutter
Ezra Sutton
Kurt Suzuki
Pedro Swann
Dansby Swanson
Anthony Swarzak
Bill Sweeney
Bill Swift

T

John Taber
Roy Talcott
Chuck Tanner
Tony Tarasco
Pop Tate
Julián Tavárez
Ed Taylor
Hawk Taylor
Zack Taylor
Julio Teherán
Mark Teixeira
Fred Tenney
Frank Tepedino
Zeb Terry
Duane Theiss
Tommy Thevenow
Bert Thiel
Tom Thobe
Andrés Thomas
Charles Thomas
Frank Thomas
Herb Thomas
Lee Thomas
Roy Thomas
Walt Thomas
Don Thompson
Fuller Thompson
Mike Thompson
Milt Thompson
Tommy Thompson
Bobby Thomson
John Thomson
Scott Thorman
Bob Thorpe
Jim Thorpe
Bobby Tiefenauer
Cotton Tierney
Bob Tillman
John Titus
Jim Tobin
Josh Tomlin
Earl Torgeson
Red Torphy
Frank Torre
Joe Torre
Pablo Torrealba
Steve Torrealba
Lou Tost
Clay Touchstone
Touki Toussaint
Ira Townsend
Leo Townsend
Walt Tragesser
Jeff Treadway
Alex Treviño
Sam Trott
Bob Trowbridge
Michael Tucker
Preston Tucker
Tommy Tucker
Tom Tuckey
Jim Turner
George Twombly
Fred Tyler
Johnnie Tyler
Lefty Tyler
Jim Tyng

U

Bob Uecker
Dan Uggla
Mike Ulicny
Arnold Umbach
Tim Unroe
Bill Upham
Cecil Upshaw
Melvin Upton Jr.
Justin Upton
Luke Urban
Billy Urbanski

V

Marc Valdes
Sandy Valdespino
Luis Valdez
Sergio Valdez
Bill Van Dyke
Roberto Vargas
Bill Vargus
Pete Varney
Anthony Varvaro
Jorge Vásquez
Jim Vatcher
Charlie Vaughan
Javier Vázquez
Al Veigel
Freddie Velázquez
Pat Veltman
Jonny Venters
Quilvio Veras
Emil Verban
Mickey Vernon
Zoilo Versalles
Lee Viau
Óscar Villarreal
Ismael Villegas
Ozzie Virgil Jr.
Arodys Vizcaíno
Bill Voiselle
Jake Volz
Tony Von Fricken
Phil Voyles

W

Terrell Wade
Bill Wagner
Billy Wagner
Jordan Walden
Bob Walk
Jeremy Walker
Murray Wall
Lefty Wallace
Norm Wallen
Ed Walsh
Joe Walsh
Bucky Walters
Jerome Walton
Lloyd Waner
Paul Waner
Daryle Ward
Duane Ward
John Warner
Rabbit Warstler
Link Wasem
Claudell Washington
Bob Watson
Mule Watson
Ken Weafer
Orlie Weaver
Jacob Webb
Bert Weeden
Roy Weir
Walt Weiss
Jimmy Welsh
Don Wengert
Stan Wentzel
Johnny Werts
Mark Wasinger
Frank West
Max West
Oscar Westerberg
Al Weston
Jeff Wetherby
Bert Whaling
Bobby Wheelock
Tom Whelan
Pete Whisenant
Larry Whisenton
Bob Whitcher
Charlie White
Deacon White
Ernie White
Jack White
Kirby White
Sam White
Sammy White
Steve White
Will White
Ed Whited
Gil Whitehouse
Gurdon Whiteley
Mark Whiten
Matt Whiteside
Chase Whitley
Frank Whitney
Jim Whitney
Pinky Whitney
Ernie Whitt
Possum Whitted
Al Wickland
Bob Wickman
Whitey Wietelmann
Claude Wilborn
Hoyt Wilhelm
Kaiser Wilhelm
Joe Wilhoit
Jerry Willard
Carl Willey
Earl Williams (C)
Earl Williams (C/1B)
Gerald Williams
Pop Williams
Vic Willis
Art Wilson
Bryse Wilson
Charlie Wilson
Craig Wilson
Frank Wilson
Jack Wilson
Jim Wilson
Zeke Wilson
Joe Winkelsas
Dan Winkler
Casey Wise
DeWayne Wise
Nick Wise
Sam Wise
Matt Wisler
Roy Witherup
Mark Wohlers
Harry Wolverton
Sid Womack
Brad Woodall
George Woodend
Chris Woodward
Woody Woodward
Chuck Workman
Red Worthington
Ab Wright
Al Wright
Ed Wright
George Wright
Harry Wright
Jaret Wright
Kyle Wright
Sam Wright
Jimmy Wynn

Y

Tyler Yates
George Yeager
Al Yeargin
Bill Yerrick
Huascar Ynoa
Cy Young
Harley Young
Herman Young
Irv Young
Matt Young

Z

Tom Zachary
Steve Ziem
Guy Zinn
Paul Zuvella

External links
BR Batting statistics
BR Pitching statistics

Major League Baseball all-time rosters